Triac may refer to:

 TRIAC (triode for alternating current), an electronics component
 Triac (car), a green vehicle 
 Tiratricol, a common thyroid hormone analogue used for treating thyroid hormone resistance syndrome